Beast Hunter is a television series that began airing on March 9, 2011 on National Geographic Channel. It is hosted and narrated by wildlife scientist Pat Spain. In each episode, he travels to a different part of the world to investigate an individual cryptid's alleged existence. This typically involves interviews with local witnesses, setting up camera traps, and in some cases, searching for similar animals in the local fossil record. When the series is aired in the UK, it is renamed Beast Man.

Episodes

See also

Cryptid
Cryptozoology
MonsterQuest

References

External links
 Overview

Cryptozoological television series
National Geographic (American TV channel) original programming